Martin Hinrich Carl Lichtenstein (10 January 1780 – 2 September 1857) was a German physician, explorer, botanist and zoologist.

Biography
Born in Hamburg, Lichtenstein was the son of Anton August Heinrich Lichtenstein. He studied medicine at Jena and Helmstedt. Between 1802 and 1806 he travelled in southern Africa, becoming the personal physician of the Governor of the Cape of Good Hope. In 1811 he published Reisen im südlichen Afrika : in den Jahren 1803, 1804, 1805, und 1806; as a result, he was appointed professor of zoology at the University of Berlin in 1811, and appointed director of the Berlin Zoological Museum in 1813. In 1829, he was elected a foreign member of the Royal Swedish Academy of Sciences.

He died after he had a stroke at sea travelling aboard a steamer from Korsør to Kiel.

Legacy

Lichtenstein was responsible for the creation of Berlin's Zoological Gardens in 1841, when he persuaded King Frederick William IV of Prussia to donate the grounds of his pheasantry. He also published Johann Reinhold Forster's manuscripts for Descriptiones animalium in 1844.

In the field of herpetology he described many new species of amphibians and reptiles.

Among species named by Lichtenstein are included the Australian king parrot (Alisterus scapularis), the crowned sandgrouse (Pterocles coronatus), and the Cape night adder (Causus rhombeatus).

In 1826, botanists Cham. & Schltdl. published a genus of flowering plants from South Africa, belonging to the family Apiaceae as Lichtensteinia in his honour.

In 1856 Johann Jakob Kaup named the seahorse Hippocampus lichtensteinii after him.

Then in 1859 Italian herpetologist, Giorgio Jan, named the forest night adder (Causus lichtensteinii) in his honor of Hinrich Lichtenstein, as did the Dutch zoologist Coenraad Jacob Temminck with Lichtenstein's sandgrouse (Pterocles lichtensteinii ).

Writings
Lichtenstein's Reisen im südlichen Afrika in den Jahren 1803, 1804, 1805 und 1806 was translated into English, and published in 1812 as "Travels in Southern Africa in the years 1803, 1804, 1805 and 1806".
 Reisen im südlichen Afrika. 1803–1806. Mit einer Einführung von Wahrhold Drascher. 1811. 2 Bände (Neudruck: Brockhaus Antiquarium, Stuttgart 1967).
 Nachrichten von Teneriffa. Ein Fragment aus dem Tagebuche des Hrn. Dr. Lichtenstein auf der Reise von Amsterdam nach dem Vorgebirge der guten Hofnung 1802. Industrie-Comptoirs, Weimar 1806
 Über die Beetjuanas. Als Nachtrag und Berichtigung zu Barrows Auszug aus Trüters Tagebuch einer Reise zu den Buschwanas. Vom Hrn. Dr. Hinrich Lichtenstein. Industrie-Comptoirs, Weimar 1807
 Darstellung neuer oder wenig bekannter Säugethiere in Abbildungen und Beschreibungen von 65 Arten auf 50 colorirten Steindrucktafeln, nach den Originalen des Zoologischen Museums der Universität Berlin. Lüderitz, Berlin 1827/34.
 Zur Geschichte der Sing-Akademie in Berlin. Nebst einer Nachricht über das Fest am funfzigsten Jahrestage Ihrer Stiftung und einem alphabetischen Verzeichniss aller Personen, die ihr als Mitglieder angehört haben. Verlag Trautwein, Berlin 1843.

Literature 
 Ernst Rudorff (Hrsg.): Briefe von Carl Maria von Weber an Hinrich Lichtenstein. Mit drei Porträts, drei Abbildungen und sechs Faksimiles. George Westermann, Braunschweig 1900. VIII Seiten, 252 Seiten, mit Abb.
 Wilhelm Bölsche (Hrsg.): Neue Welten. Die Eroberung der Erde in Darstellungen großer Naturforscher. Anthologie mit Texten von Georg Forster, Hinrich Lichtenstein, Karl von den Steinen, Ferdinand Hochstetter, Alfred Russel Wallace, Adelbert von Chamisso, Alexander von Humboldt und Charles Darwin – jeweils mit Einleitung von Wilhelm Bölsche. EA. Deutsche Bibliothek, Berlin 1917. XXIV, 644 S., 1 Bl. Mit 24 Tafeln.
F.D. Steinheimer, 2008 Martin Hinrich Carl Lichtenstein and his ornithological purchases at the auction of William Bullock's museum in 1819 Archives of Natural History, Volume 35 Issue 1, Page 88–99, ISSN 0260-9541

References

German taxonomists
1780 births
1857 deaths
19th-century German botanists
German entomologists
German ornithologists
Members of the Royal Swedish Academy of Sciences
Academic staff of the Humboldt University of Berlin
University of Helmstedt alumni
University of Jena alumni
Physicians from Hamburg
19th-century German zoologists